Myoxomorpha is a genus of beetles in the family Cerambycidae, containing the following species:

 Myoxomorpha alvarengorum Monné & Magno, 1990
 Myoxomorpha funesta (Erichson in Schomburg, 1848)
 Myoxomorpha seabrai Marinoni & Dalossi, 1971
 Myoxomorpha vidua Lacordaire, 1872

References

Acanthoderini